Del Sur (Spanish for "Of The South") is an unincorporated community in the Mojave Desert, in Los Angeles County, California. The town has a population of about 1,750. The ZIP Code is 93536 and the community is inside area code 661.

History
Del Sur is derived from a Spanish phrase meaning "of the south".

Geography
It is surrounded by the city of Lancaster.

References

Unincorporated communities in Los Angeles County, California
Populated places in the Mojave Desert
Unincorporated communities in California